The Kerala Legislative Assembly election of 1957 was the first assembly election in the Indian state of Kerala. The Communist Party of India won the election with 60 seats. The election led to the formation of first democratically elected communist government in India.

State Reorganization
On 1 November 1956, under the States Reorganisation Act, 1956, Kerala was formed by the merger of Travancore-Cochin state with the Malabar district (including Fort Cochin and the Laccadive Islands) of Madras State, Kasaragod taluk of the South Canara district and the Amindive Islands. The southern part of Travancore-Cochin, the five taluks of Agastheeswaram, Thovala, Kalkulam, Vilavahcode, and Shencotta, were transferred from Travancore-Cochin to the Madras State. After the reorganization, the assembly constituencies increased from 106 with 117 seats in 1954 to 114 with 126 seats in 1957.

Background 
Following the States Reorganisation Act, 1956, the Malabar District of Madras state merged with Travancore-Cochin to form the new state of Kerala on 1 November 1956. The merger helped the Communist Party of India to increase their base in the region. The ruling Indian National Congress lost the prominence due to the factionalism within the party. Furthermore, communalism and struggles against feudalism played a major role.

Election 
The Election Commission of India conducted elections to the newly created state between 28 February – 11 March 1957. The elections were held to the 126 seats (114 constituencies) including 12 two member constituencies of which 11 and one reserved for Scheduled Castes and Scheduled Tribes respectively, in which 406 candidates were contested. The voter turnout was 65.49%.

Results
The result of the elections listed below:

|- style="background-color:#E9E9E9; text-align:center;"
! class="unsortable" |
! Political party !! Flag !! Seats  Contested !! Won !! % of  Seats
! Votes !! Vote % !! Vote % in  contested seats
|-
| 
| style="text-align:center;" |Indian National Congress
|  
| 124 || 43 || 34.13 || 2,209,251 || 37.85 || 38.1
|- style="background: #90EE90;"
| 
| style="text-align:center;" |Communist Party of India
| 
| 101 || 60 || 47.62 || 2,059,547 || 35.28 || 40.57
|-
| 
| style="text-align:center;" |Praja Socialist Party
|
| 65 || 9 || 7.14 || 628,261 || 10.76 || 17.48
|-
| 
| style="text-align:center;" |Revolutionary Socialist Party
|
| 28 || 0 ||  || 188,553 || 3.23 || 11.12
|-
| 
|
| 86 || 14 || 11.11 || 751,965 || 12.88 || N/A
|- class="unsortable" style="background-color:#E9E9E9"
! colspan = 2|
! style="text-align:center;" |Total seats !! 126 !! style="text-align:center;" |Voters !! 89,13,247 !! style="text-align:center;" |Turnout !! colspan = 3|58,37,577 (65.49%)
|}

In the election, five women candidates were elected out of nine candidates.

By Constituency

Government formation 
Communist Party of India formed the government with the support of five independents. On 5 April 1957, E. M. S. Namboodiripad became the chief minister of Kerala and first non–Congress chief minister of the country (PSP ruled Travencore Cochin state before). But the government was dismissed in 1959 by the central government following the Liberation Struggle.

See also 
 E. M. S. Namboodiripad Ministry Term 1
 1957 elections in India
 1954 Travancore-Cochin Legislative Assembly election

References 

1957
1957
Kerala